Little Poison may refer to:

Bruce Mather (ice hockey) (1926–1975), an American ice hockey player
Jesús Pimentel (born 1940), a Mexican bantamweight boxer
Rigoberto Riasco (born 1953), a Panamanian professional boxer
Paul Runyan (1908–2002), American professional golfer
Lloyd Waner (1906–1982), Major League Baseball center fielder with the Pittsburgh Pirates
Lil Poison, born Victor De Leon III (1998), the youngest professional gamer